Stephen Kean (born 30 September 1967) is a Scottish football coach and former player, who is currently the academy director at Hibernian. Kean played as a winger for clubs in the lower divisions of Scottish, English and Portuguese leagues in the 1980s and 1990s, before moving into coaching. After a 21-month spell in charge of Blackburn Rovers, he resigned on 28 September 2012.

Playing career
Kean grew up in Cumbernauld, a new town on the outskirts of Glasgow, attending St. Maurice's High School. Upon leaving school, he joined Celtic as a professional, but was unable to break into a first team then dominated by Celtic legends Tommy Burns, Murdo MacLeod and Paul McStay.

He joined Swansea City on loan in 1987, at the same time as Chris Coleman. They formed a lasting professional relationship, which carried on after both of their playing days had ended.

Kean then played for Académica Coimbra in Portugal, making nine appearances, and scoring one goal in all competitions. During his time in Portugal, Kean also played for Naval.

Coaching and management career

Coaching career
Since retiring from playing Kean has worked as a coach for Reading, Fulham, Real Sociedad and Coventry City, working as an assistant to Chris Coleman at Fulham, Real Sociedad and Coventry.

In June 2008, it was reported that Kean was in talks with Chelsea to become assistant manager to Luiz Felipe Scolari. Kean's fluency in Portuguese from his playing days was believed to be a key reason for Chelsea's interest.

Blackburn Rovers
On 4 August 2009, Blackburn Rovers manager Sam Allardyce appointed Kean as his new first team coach. Kean replaced Karl Robinson who returned to Milton Keynes Dons. Allardyce commented that he had received numerous applications for the first team coaching position and Kean "stood out above the rest through his personality, experience and knowledge of football at the highest level".

After the sacking of Allardyce on 13 December 2010 by new Blackburn owners Venky's, Kean was initially installed as caretaker manager but on 22 December 2010, he was appointed manager on a contract until the end of the season to prove his abilities in that position. On 4 January 2011, it was revealed by Anuradha Desai, chairperson of Venky's, that Kean would be offered a new two-to-three-year long-term contract to manage the club and on 20 January 2011, it was confirmed by Blackburn that Kean had signed a contract until June 2013. Kean's appointment was shrouded in a great deal of controversy since his agent Jerome Anderson had earlier played a major role in advising Venky's during the takeover of the club in the preceding months. Furthermore, Allardyce later received "substantial", but undisclosed, damages from Kean after Kean had been recorded in a bar in Hong Kong falsely alleging that Allardyce had been sacked from his post at Blackburn Rovers because he was a crook.

Kean started brightly as manager, but ten games without a win saw Rovers dragged into relegation trouble. A 15th-place finish was secured with a 3–2 win over Wolverhampton Wanderers on the final day of the 2010–11 Premier League season.

In November 2011, Blackburn confirmed that Kean had signed a new contract with improved terms, despite the club being in the bottom place of the league. This came despite Kean's comments less than a week earlier stating: "Yes, there have been discussions about a new contract, but I have told the owners that this is an inappropriate time to conclude any new contract discussions". The new deal came after months of protests at the club in which fans campaigned to have Kean removed as Rovers manager as he had recorded just one league win all season. At the time, Steve Kean was Blackburn Rovers' second worst manager since 1992, with only Paul Ince scoring a lower win percentage.

Further controversy was created when Kean admitted 'forfeiting' a League Cup quarter-final at Cardiff City for the sake of their league form, with fans subsequently demanding a refund for the ticket price, travel expenses and money lost due to not working on the day. In December 2011, the local newspaper and MP Jack Straw joined the fans in calling for Kean's resignation ahead of a crucial home match with Bolton Wanderers. Another defeat concluded Kean's first 38 league games as Blackburn manager in which he had amassed just 32 points and left Rovers bottom of the table at Christmas. Despite all of this, Kean remained defiant by insisting that he would stay in his job long enough to fashion a revival and that he would be "100% shocked" if he was sacked.

Results were somewhat improved in the second half of the season but five successive defeats in April dragged Rovers deep into relegation trouble again with Kean having recorded just 12 wins from his 55 league games since he took over. On 7 May 2012, a home loss against Wigan Athletic relegated Blackburn Rovers to the Football League Championship and ended an eleven-year run in the top flight.

Kean left his position as Rovers' manager on 28 September 2012 with the club third in the Championship table. He declared that he had been "forced to resign" and that his position had been "untenable".

DPMM FC
In October 2013 Kean agreed a deal to become the new manager of S.League side DPMM FC. Kean signed an initial one-year contract with the club in Brunei on 28 November 2013. Brunei led the 2014 S.League for the majority of the campaign but ended up finishing as runners up to Warriors FC following a 2–1 defeat to Tampines Rovers on the final day of the season. They were also knocked out of the 2014 Singapore Cup in the semi-final by Home United. The team did lift some silverware however, as they won the 2014 Singapore League Cup, beating Tanjong Pagar United 2–0 in the final.

Kean was also appointed as the head coach of Brunei national football team for the 2014 AFF Suzuki Cup qualification tournament in Laos in October 2014.

Brunei DPMM clinched the S-League championship on 21 November 2015, with a 4–0 win at home to Balestier Khalsa. Kean was named as the S.League's coach of the year in 2015.

In early November it was announced that Kean would leave Brunei DPMM at the end of the 2017 S.League season, a year before his contract with the club ended.

Melbourne Victory
On 23 October 2020 Kean was announced as the assistant coach for Melbourne Victory, serving under head coach Grant Brebner. Brebner and Kean had previously worked together during their time with Reading, with Kean serving as Academy Director and then First Team Coach, while Brebner was a player. In April 2021, Kean was appointed as interim coach until the end of the 2020–21 A-League season, following the sacking of Grant Brebner.

Hibernian
Kean became academy director of Scottish club Hibernian in November 2021, and was given the task of identifying youth players who could be promoted into the first team squad. He was linked with managerial vacancies at Dundee and Charlton Athletic during the 2022 close season, but stayed with Hibs into the 2022–23 season. For that season he decided that Hibs should not enter a "B" team in the Lowland League, as done by Celtic, Rangers and Hearts, and would instead enter the SPFL Reserve League, play friendlies against English clubs and participate in the 2022–23 UEFA Youth League. In the latter competition, Hibs progressed through the first two rounds by defeating Norwegian side Molde FK and French club Nantes, which earned them a place in the knockout phase.

Personal life
On 15 August 2011, Kean was convicted of drink driving at Macclesfield Magistrates' Court. The Court rejected his defence that his drinks had been spiked following a match against Manchester United. He was banned from driving for 18 months and fined £1,800.

Managerial statistics

Honours

Manager
DPMM
S.League: 2015
Singapore League Cup: 2014

Individual
S.League Coach of the Year: 2015

References

External links

Steve Kean at The Celtic Wiki

1967 births
Living people
People from Cumbernauld
Scottish footballers
Association football wingers
Celtic F.C. players
Swansea City A.F.C. players
Alloa Athletic F.C. players
Associação Académica de Coimbra – O.A.F. players
Associação Naval 1º de Maio players
Bath City F.C. players
Newbury Town F.C. players
English Football League players
Scottish Football League players
Scottish expatriate footballers
Expatriate footballers in Portugal
Scottish expatriate sportspeople in Portugal
Scottish football managers
Blackburn Rovers F.C. managers
Premier League managers
Fulham F.C. non-playing staff
Coventry City F.C. non-playing staff
Expatriate football managers in Brunei
Brunei national football team managers
Singapore Premier League head coaches
Real Sociedad non-playing staff
DPMM FC managers
Scottish expatriate sportspeople in Spain
British expatriate sportspeople in Brunei
Scottish expatriate football managers
English Football League managers
A-League Men managers
Association football coaches
Melbourne Victory FC managers
Hibernian F.C. non-playing staff